The Roman Catholic Diocese of Mawlamyine (Lat: Diocesis Maulamyinensis) is a diocese of the Latin Church of the Roman Catholic Church in Burma.

The diocese was erected in 1993, from its metropolitan, the Archdiocese of Yangon.

The first and only bishop of the diocese is Raymond Saw Po Ray, appointed in 1993.

Ordinaries
Raymond Saw Po Ray (22 Mar 1993 Appointed - )

See also
Catholic Church in Burma

References

Mawlamyine
Christian organizations established in 1993
Roman Catholic dioceses and prelatures established in the 20th century